Huanghelu is a metro station of Zhengzhou Metro. This station is an interchange station between Line 2 and Line 5 after Line 5 started operation on 20 May 2019.

Interchange stations of Line 5 are decorated with themes of prefecture-level cities in Henan province. The station is the Anyang themed station, having a mural at the concourse of Line 5 featuring the Chinese characters theme.

Station layout  
The station is located beneath the crossing of Huayuan Road and Huanghe Road. It has three levels underground. The B1 level is for the concourse. The island platform for Line 5 is on the B2 level and the island platform for Line 2 is on the B3 level.

Exits 
The station currently has 3 exits open.

Gallery

References 

Stations of Zhengzhou Metro
Line 2, Zhengzhou Metro
Line 5, Zhengzhou Metro
Railway stations in China opened in 2016